Juan González de Mendoza, O.S.A. (1545 – 14 February 1618) was a Spanish bishop, explorer, sinologist, and writer. He was the author of one of the earliest Western histories of China. Published by him in 1585, Historia de las cosas más notables, ritos y costumbres del gran reyno de la China (The History of the Great and Mighty Kingdom of China and the Situation Thereof) is an account of observations of several Spanish travelers in China.  An English translation by Robert Parke appeared in 1588 and was reprinted by the Hakluyt Society in two volumes, edited by Sir George T. Staunton, Bart. (London, 1853–54).

González de Mendoza's Historia was mostly superseded in 1615 by the work of much more informed Jesuit missionaries who actually lived in China, Matteo Ricci and Nicolas Trigault, De Christiana expeditione apud Sinas.  Much of González de Mendoza's work was plagiarised from Escalante's Discurso de la navegacion

Biography

González de Mendoza was born at Torrecilla en Cameros (La Rioja (Spain)) in 1545. He joined the army but after some years resigned to enter the Order of Saint Augustine. He published his most famous text in 1585, Historia de las cosas más notables, ritos y costumbres del gran reyno de la China. It was based on the journals of Miguel de Luarca, whose 1580 trip to Ming China provided a simple majority thereof. He never set foot in China, but spent two years in Mexico before returning to Spain.

On 31 May 1593, he was appointed during the papacy of Pope Clement VIII as Bishop of Lipari. On 7 June 1593, he was consecrated bishop by Filippo Spinola, Cardinal-Priest of Santa Sabina, with Cristóbal Senmanat y Robuster, Bishop of Orihuela, and Lorenzo Celsi (bishop), Bishop of Castro del Lazio, serving as co-consecrators. 
On 24 May 1599, he resigned as Bishop of Lipari.
On 7 May 1607, he was appointed during the papacy of Pope Paul V as Bishop of Chiapas.
On 17 November 1608, he was appointed during the papacy of Pope Paul V as Bishop of Popayán.
He served as Bishop of Popayán until his death on 14 February 1618.

Episcopal succession
While bishop, he was the principal co-consecrator of:
Pedro Castro Nero, Bishop of Lugo (1599);
Juan Ramírez de Arellano (bishop), Bishop of Santiago de Guatemala (1600); and 
Juan Pérez de Espinosa, Bishop of Santiago de Chile (1600).

Bibliography
 Historia de las cosas más notables, ritos y costumbres del gran reyno de la China (original Spanish; Rome, 1585)
 The history of the great and mighty kingdom of China and the situation thereof (English translation by Robert Parke, 1588)
 an 1853 reprint by Hakluyt Society: ; vol. 1 at archive.org vol. 2 at archive.org;  vol. 1 at Project Gutenberg; vol. 2 at Project Gutenberg
 reprint: 
 reprint: 
 Links to many other translations:

See also
 Martín Ignacio de Loyola

References

External links

 
 

1545 births
1618 deaths
16th-century male writers
16th-century Roman Catholic bishops in Sicily
16th-century Spanish writers
17th-century Roman Catholic bishops in Mexico
Augustinian bishops
Augustinian friars
Bishops appointed by Pope Clement VIII
Bishops appointed by Pope Paul V
Explorers of Asia
Foreign relations of the Ming dynasty
People from Toledo, Spain
Spanish Roman Catholic bishops in South America
Spanish sinologists
Roman Catholic bishops of Popayán